Elfreda Annmary Chatman (1942-2002) was an African-American researcher, professor, and former Catholic religious sister. She was well known for her ethnographic approaches in researching information seeking behaviors among understudied or minority groups (poor people, the elderly, retired women, female inmates, and janitors).

Contributions 

Dr. Chatman's research contributions or developments resulted in several middle-range theories: Information Poverty, Life in Round, and Normative Behavior. Based on her background in sociology, she introduced her "small worlds" method to studying information behavior.

Life in the Round 
This theory draws on Chatman's study of female prisoners at a maximum-security prison in the northeastern United States. After observing inmates both during and outside their interactions with the prison's professional employees, Chatman observes that the women live "in the round", that is, "within an acceptable degree of approximation and imprecision". Instead of seeking information about the outside world, over which they have no control, prisoners avoid gathering this type of information: in order to survive, they place importance on "daily living patterns, relationships, and issues that come within the prison environment" over which they can exercise agency. In this way, inmates display defensive information seeking behavior.

Inmates form a "small world," a closed community where private opinion gives way to a shared reality and accompanying information-seeking behavior. Social norms established by inmates determine the importance or triviality of a piece of information; as such, information that affects prisoners in an immediate way - such as illness while medical staff are off-duty - gain importance, while information on the outside  world becomes trivial. Chatman concludes that life in the round disfavor's information seeking behaviour, as there is no need to search for outside information. Prisoners "are not part of the world... being defined by outsiders"; because inmates do not need additional information to participate fully in their reality, they do not seek it out.

Chatman saw that these disincentives to information seeking could become cultural norms in the small worlds that the people she observed took their norms from, and that these cultural norms could produce what she labeled information poverty, where a group could perpetuate norms that would cause the avoidance of information that would be useful to people in the group if they were to seek it out.

Biography 

Chatman received her B.S. from Youngstown State University, her M.S.L.S. from Case Western Reserve University, and her Ph.D. from the University of California, Berkeley. She was also at one point a member of the Humility Sisters Of Mary based in Ohio.

Her 1992 book, The Information World of Retired Women (Greenwood Press), won the ACRL Best Book Award in 1995. Chatman participated in the American Library Association's Library Research Round Table (LRRT) during the 1980s and 1990s, and served as LRRT Chair in 1993-1994. 

Chatman was a professor for more than a decade at the University of North Carolina at Chapel Hill UNC School of Information and Library Science, starting in 1983, and a research award there is named for her. 

She was teaching at the School of Information Studies at Florida State University at the time of her death on January 15, 2002, at the age of 59.

Legacy 
An Association for Information Science and Technology Special Interest Group named a research award for her in 2005.

Works
The diffusion of information among the working poor. Ann Arbor, Mich.: University Microfilms International, 1984.

The information world of retired women. New York: Greenwood Press, 1992.

  

 
"Framing social life in theory and research". The New Review of Information Behaviour Research. 1: 3-17. 2000.

References

Further reading

American Library Association. "Tribute to Dr. Elfreda A. Chatman". (2002)

Florida State Times. Obituaries. (2002)

González-Teruel, A., & Abad-García, F. (2018). The influence of Elfreda Chatman’s theories: a citation context analysis. Scientometrics, 117(3), 1793–1819. https://doi.org/10.1007/s11192-018-2915-3
Pollock, Neil. "Conceptualising the Information Poor: An assessment of the contribution of Elfreda Chatman towards an understanding of behaviour within the context of information poverty." (2002)

2002 deaths
American social scientists
Youngstown State University alumni
Case Western Reserve University alumni
University of California, Berkeley alumni
Florida State University faculty
1942 births
African-American librarians
American women librarians
American librarians
University of North Carolina at Chapel Hill faculty
20th-century African-American women
20th-century African-American people
20th-century American people
American women academics
21st-century African-American people
21st-century African-American women
African-American Catholics
Information scientists